Ephraim Carlebach (March 12, 1879 in Lübeck – 1936 in Ramat Gan, British Mandate of Palestine), was a German-born  Orthodox rabbi.

Biography
Carlebach belonged to a well-known German rabbi family. His father Salomon Carlebach (1845–1919) was rabbi in Lübeck. He had seven brothers and four sisters. He attended the Katharineum school in Lübeck, where he befriended his schoolmate Thomas Mann, as the latter recalled.

Four of his brothers were rabbis as well. They were Emanuel Carlebach (1874-1927), Joseph Carlebach (1883–1942), David Carlebach (1885–1913) and Hartwig Naftali Carlebach (1889–1967). Carlebach is most known for his work in founding Orthodox Jewish schools in Germany, notably Leipzig, from 1900.

In 1924, he was appointed the chief Orthodox Rabbi of Leipzig. In 1935, Carlebach moved to the British Mandate of Palestine where he died in 1936. His son Esriel Carlebach was the founder and first editor of the newspaper Maariv. His nephew Shlomo Carlebach was known as "The Singing Rabbi".

References

Ephraim
Chief rabbis of cities
Rabbis in Mandatory Palestine
German Orthodox rabbis
Jewish emigrants from Nazi Germany to Mandatory Palestine
Aliyah
Clergy from Lübeck
20th-century German rabbis
1879 births
1936 deaths
Clergy from Leipzig